Patania expictalis is a moth in the family Crambidae. It was described by Johan Christian Fabricius in 1781. It is found in the Democratic Republic of the Congo (Orientale Province) and Zambia.

References

Moths described in 1781
Spilomelinae
Taxa named by Johan Christian Fabricius
Moths of Africa